The flag of Zabaykalsky Krai, along with the coat of arms, is the official symbol of Zabaykalsky Krai, a federal subject of Russia.

The law adopting the flag and the coat of arms of the krai were adopted by the Legislative Assembly on 11 February 2009 and signed into law by the Governor on 17 February 2009.  The flag became official on 1 March 2010.  On the same day at 10:00 AM, the flag was hoisted on the building of the krai government. The flag was raised and lowered at least five times to enable the journalists present to take quality photographs.

Visually, the flag is unchanged from the flag of Chita Oblast, a predecessor of Zabaykalsky Krai. It is a horizontal green and red bi-colour charged with a yellow triangle at the hoist side, where yellow symbolizes the endless steppes, prosperity, and justice; green symbolizes the taiga and the rich fauna of the krai, as well as hope, joy, and prosperity; and red symbolizes the energy-rich natural resources, bravery, and fearlessness.

References

Zabaykalsky Krai
Zabaykalsky Krai
Zabaykalskly